Michael Hubert Austen (born 17 May 1964) is a South African-born cricketer who played for Western Province in South African domestic cricket between the 1982/83 and 1988/89 seasons and for Otago and Wellington between the 1989/90 and 1997/98 seasons. Austen worked as a doctor throughout his career in New Zealand.

Austen was born at Cape Town in South Africa in 1964. He was educated at Rondebosch Boys High School and worked professionally as a doctor. He made his senior debut for Western Province B in a SAB Bowl match against Border in March 1983. He played mainly for Western Province B in the Bowl competition, before making four appearances for Western Province in the 1987/88 Currie Cup. He played a single first-class match for a South African Universities side in 1987.

He moved to New Zealand to play for Otago at the start of the 1989/90 season, moving to Wellington for four seasons before returning to Otago to finish his first-class career. In total he played in 66 first-class cricket and 60 List A cricket matches, scoring almost 5,000 runs and taking 94 senior wickets.

References

External links

1964 births
Living people
South African cricketers
Otago cricketers
Wellington cricketers
Western Province cricketers
North Island cricketers